The Martin Luther King Jr. Educational Campus is a five-story public school facility at 122 Amsterdam Avenue between West 65th and 66th Streets in Lincoln Square, Manhattan, New York City, near Lincoln Center. The campus is faced on Amsterdam Avenue by a wide elevated plaza which features a self-weathering steel memorial sculpture by William Tarr. The same steel was used by architect Frost Associates in the curtain wall of the building, the interior of which has an arrangement of perimeter corridors with floor-to-ceiling windows, leaving many classrooms on the inner side windowless. The school is across West 65th Street from Fiorello H. LaGuardia High School of Music & Art and Performing Arts.

History
The building was formerly the location of Martin Luther King Jr. High School, which opened in 1975. According to The New York Times, the school had been troubled throughout its history, gaining a bad reputation for its construction delay, planned curriculum restructurings, low student enrollment, and abysmal academic performance:

It has a history of violence, including the shooting of two tenth grade students inside the school on January 15, 2002, the birthday of Martin Luther King Jr. Other violence had occurred in the school:

The closing of the school was included by Chancellor Joel Klein and Mayor Michael Bloomberg in the education reform policy. The school was closed on June 27, 2005 by the New York City Department of Education.

Current configuration
The high school has been replaced by seven separate high schools which operate on different floors of the building. Students wear uniforms to distinguish them from the other schools and have separate lunch and dismissal times. The schools, listed by the date of their entry into the campus, are:

2002 – High School for Law, Advocacy, and Community Justice: The school is commonly known as MLK Law, due to its cumbersome official name. The High School for Law, Advocacy, and Community Justice graduated its first class in June 2006, consisting of approximately 60 students. In 2008, the school partnered with M.O.V.E. Inc. to implement a mentorship program.
2002 – High School of the Arts and Technology: The High School of Arts and Technology uses the third floor of the building. Ms. Geiger was its founding principal, who retired in 2016 and was replaced by the current principal, Mariela Graham. The school has now become a part of Urban Assembly, which is a non-profit organization that helps underserved youth become college and career ready.
2003 – Manhattan/Hunter College High School for Sciences: Students spend their first three years in classes in the MLK complex. Seniors spend their entire fourth year of high school on the Hunter College campus on the Upper East Side, taking a mix of high school and college-level courses. Manhattan Hunter Science is a part of the Early College Initiative. While many New York City high schools offer students the chance to take college courses, what makes Manhattan Hunter different is the level of support the students receive. Their high school English and social studies teachers travel with them to the college and offer regular classes there. While the students take college courses in math and science, the high school English and social studies teachers offer hand-holding and advice for all the subjects. The college courses in math and science tend to be large lecture classes, with as many as 600 students. A collaboration between Hunter College and the New York City Department of Education, Manhattan/Hunter High School for Science offers classes to help students prepare not only for college-level academics, but also for the freedom and responsibility of college life. The new school is designed to address the fact that more than one-third of college students nationally drop out before completing their freshman year.
2005 – High School for Arts, Imagination And Inquiry
2006 – Urban Assembly School For Media Studies
2006 – Manhattan Theatre Lab High School (founded 2004, moved into complex 2006). This school was shuttered in 2015, in the wake of poor performance and allegations of cheating.
2013 – Special Music School High School

References
Notes

Further reading
"The Metal Detector: Tales From School", New York Times, Sept. 29, 1996
"Principal Tries to Bolster Image of School Bearing King's Name", New York Times, Jan. 20, 1986
"Stockholders of a Can Company Take Meeting to 'Partner' School", New York Times, May 23, 1984

External links 

H.S. 490 Martin Luther King Jr. High School at InsideSchools.org

Official websites:
High School for Law, Advocacy, and Community Justice 
High School of Arts and Technology
Special Music School High School

nyc.gov websites:
High School for Law, Advocacy and Community Justice
New York City Department of Education: High School of Arts and Technology
Manhattan/Hunter Science High School
Special Music School

King
Public high schools in Manhattan